Şenlikköy Stadium (Turkish: Şenlikköy Stadı) is a small stadium in the Bakırköy district of Istanbul, Turkey.

It is the home stadium of Bakırköyspor. The stadium has a capacity of 8000.

Football venues in Turkey
Sports venues in Istanbul
Sport in Bakırköy